Winter is Coming may refer to:
 "Winter Is Coming", the pilot episode and motto of House Stark, on the HBO television series Game of Thrones
Game of Thrones: Winter Is Coming, a video game based on the show
 Winter Is Coming: The Medieval World of Game of Thrones, a book written by Carolyne Larrington
 Winter Is Coming: Why Vladimir Putin and the Enemies of the Free World Must Be Stopped, a book written by Russian chess grandmaster Garry Kasparov
 "Winter Is Coming", 2007 song, by Radical Face
 AEW Winter Is Coming, an annual professional wrestling event by All Elite Wrestling (AEW)

See also
 The Winter Is Coming, an album by Elf Power
 "Winter Is Coming Here Soon", a song from Jimmy Barnes' Och Aye the G'nu children's album